Vietnamese National Football Cup, now officially recognized as the BaF Meat National Cup for sponsorship reasons, is a Vietnamese football competition. It is one of the most important club competitions in Vietnam.

The Vietnamese Cup was first held in 1992. Cảng Sài Gòn was the first cup winners.

Format
Entry is open to all teams that compete in the V.League 1 (Champions League) and the V.League 2 (First League). The two teams that reach the final are exempt from the preliminary rounds of next year's competition. The cup winners qualify for the AFC Cup (relative equivalent of the UEFA Europa League).

Vietnamese National Cup winner will be also qualified for a single match of the Vietnamese Super Cup against the V.League 1 champion. If one team won both the National Cup and V.League titles, then the second runner-up team of the National Cup will be qualified for the Super Cup.

Winners

Top-performing clubs

See also 
 Football in Vietnam

References

External links 
 

 
1
National association football cups
Recurring sporting events established in 1992
1990s establishments in Vietnam